Murray "Red" Gillispie (1908 – February 26, 1942) was a professional baseball pitcher in the Negro leagues. He played with the Chicago American Giants, Memphis Red Sox, and Monroe Monarchs from 1930 to 1932.

References

External links
 and Seamheads

Chicago American Giants players
Memphis Red Sox players
Monroe Monarchs players
1908 births
1942 deaths
Baseball pitchers
Baseball players from Oklahoma
Sportspeople from Oklahoma City
20th-century African-American sportspeople